Madupa Fernando (born 13 July 1991) is an Italian cricketer. He was named in Italy's squad for the 2017 ICC World Cricket League Division Five tournament in South Africa. He played in Guernsey's opening fixture, against Guernsey, on 3 September 2017.

In September 2018, he was the joint-leading wicket-taker for Italy in Group B of the 2018–19 ICC World Twenty20 Europe Qualifier tournament, with eight dismissals in six matches. In November 2019, he was named in Italy's squad for the Cricket World Cup Challenge League B tournament in Oman. He made his List A debut, for Italy against Kenya, on 3 December 2019.

In September 2021, he was named in Italy's Twenty20 International (T20I) squad for the Regional Final of the 2021 ICC Men's T20 World Cup Europe Qualifier tournament. He made his T20I debut on 15 October 2021, for Italy against Denmark.

References

External links
 

1991 births
Living people
Italian cricketers
Italy Twenty20 International cricketers
Place of birth missing (living people)